is an airport serving the city of Tottori, Tottori Prefecture, Japan. The Airport is nicknamed , called after merged with names from Tottori Sand Dunes and Detective Conan (Case Closed) of manga artist Gosho Aoyama, who was born in Hokuei.

History

It closed in 1964. The runway is constructed of asphalt concrete.

Tottori Airport originally had service only to Tokyo, but the Tokyo service ceased in 1969 when the airport began flights to Osaka. The airport had service to both Osaka and Tokyo service from 1979 to 1985, but now only serves Tokyo.

Facilities

Tottori Airport operates from 7 am to 9 pm daily. The terminal building is a two-story structure with an observation deck. The airport also maintains a playground outside the airport.

Airlines and destinations

Adjacent airports
Miho-Yonago Airport – 
Okayama Airport – 
Oki Airport – 
Izumo Airport – 
Kobe Airport – 
Osaka International Airport –

Ground transportation

Road

Tottori Prefectural Route 264 serves exclusively as the ground access road to Tottori Airport and is accessible only by the two airport interchanges of the Tottori Bypass. Parking, rental car, and taxi services are available at the airport.

Rail

Something that is considered extremely rare amongst airports in Japan, Tottori does not have an airport railway station. Tottoridaigaku-mae Station is two stops from Tottori Station, central to the prefectural capital, which is served by both the Sanin Main Line and the Imbi Line.

Bus service

Tottori Airport is served by Hinomaru Bus Limited, which offers a connection directly to Tottori Station.

Hotels

No hotels are located at Tottori Airport. Nearby facilities are in Tottori City.

Nearby attractions

Tottori Sand Dunes – the largest sand dune in Japan, and most visited tourist destination in Tottori Prefecture
Lake Koyama
Daisen – the highest mountain in the Chūgoku region which bears a strong resemblance to Mount Fuji. The peak, Kengamine, is inaccessible to hikers due to instability cause by the 2000 Tottori earthquake, but hiking from Daisen-ji to Misen Peak remains a popular alternative.
Sanbutsu-ji – a Buddhist temple designated a National Treasures of Japan

References

External links
 Airport official
 
 

Airports in Japan
Transport in Tottori Prefecture
Buildings and structures in Tottori Prefecture
Tottori (city)
1967 establishments in Japan
Airports established in 1967